73rd may refer to:

73rd (Perthshire) Regiment of Foot also known as MacLeod's Highlanders after its founder John Mackenzie, Lord MacLeod
73rd Academy Awards honored the best films of 2000 and was held on March 25, 2001
73rd Carnatic Infantry, an infantry regiment of the British Indian Army
73rd Cavalry Regiment (United States), a Cavalry Regiment in the U.S. Army first formed in 1941
73rd Delaware General Assembly, a meeting of the legislative branch of the state government
73rd Field Artillery (United States), a Field Artillery regiment of the United States Army
73rd Grey Cup, the 1985 Canadian Football League championship game at Olympic Stadium, Montreal
73rd Illinois Volunteer Infantry Regiment, an infantry regiment that served in the Union Army during the American Civil War
73rd Infantry Division (Germany), a German military unit which served during World War II
73rd Infantry Regiment (France), a French infantry regiment
73rd meridian east, a line of longitude 73° east of Greenwich
73rd meridian west, a line of longitude 73° west of Greenwich
73rd New York Volunteer Infantry Regiment, an infantry regiment of Union Army in the American Civil War
73rd Ohio Infantry, an infantry regiment in the Union Army during the American Civil War
73rd Oregon Legislative Assembly, the Oregon Legislative Assembly (OLA)'s period from 2005 to 2006
73rd parallel north, a circle of latitude that is 73° north of the Earth's equatorial plane, in the Arctic
73rd parallel south, a circle of latitude that is 73° south of the Earth's equatorial plane, in the Antarctic
73rd Regiment Indiana Infantry, an infantry regiment that served in the Union Army during the American Civil War
73rd Regiment of Foot (Invalids), an infantry regiment of the British Army from 1762 to 1768
73rd United States Congress, a meeting of the legislative branch of the United States federal government
California's 73rd State Assembly district, one of 80 districts in the California State Assembly

See also
73 (number)
AD 73, the year 73 (LXXIII) of the Julian calendar